Les Ténèbres du Dehors is an album by neoclassical band Elend. It is the second in the Officium Tenebrarum trilogy.

The album was remastered and re-released in April 2001 with a bonus track called Birds of Dawn (originally on a Holy Records sampler) with a red-tinted cover, instead of the original blue.

Track listing
"Nocturne" — (4:51)
"Ethereal Journeys" — (14:29)
"The Luciferian Revolution" — (10:57)
"Eden (The Angel in the Garden)" — (4:17)
"The Silence of Light" — (8:05)
"Antienne" — (6:45)
"Dancing under the Closed Eyes of Paradise" — (9:36)
"Birds of Dawn" — (12:10)*
"Les Ténèbres du Dehors" — (4:23)

* Bonus track on 2001 re-release

Musicians
All instruments and vocals performed by Nathalie Barbary, Eve Gabrielle Siskind, Iskandar Hasnawi and Renaud Tschirner.

References

1996 albums
Elend (band) albums